Bismarck Municipal Stadium is a baseball stadium in Bismarck, North Dakota. Built in 1921, the stadium was reconfigured in 1992 and renovated again in 2014.

Since 1928, it has been home to the Bismarck Governors (American Legion Lloyd Spetz Post No. 1) team. In the 1930s, it was home to the Bismarck Churchills independent team, most famous for having Baseball Hall of Famer Satchel Paige leading its roster. It was also home to the minor league baseball teams, the Bismarck Capitals (1922–1923), Bismarck Barons (1955–1957) and Bismarck-Mandan Pards (1962–1964, 1966).

Currently, it is home to the Bismarck Larks of the Northwoods League, a collegiate summer baseball league.

References

External links
 Bismarck Larks - official site
 Northwoods League - official site

Baseball venues in North Dakota
Sports in Bismarck, North Dakota
Buildings and structures in Bismarck, North Dakota
1921 establishments in North Dakota